Received Pronunciation (RP) is the accent traditionally regarded as the standard and most prestigious form of spoken British English. For over a century, there has been argument over such questions as the definition of RP, whether it is geographically neutral, how many speakers there are, whether sub-varieties exist, how appropriate a choice it is as a standard and how the accent has changed over time. The name itself is controversial. RP is an accent, so the study of RP is concerned only with matters of pronunciation; other areas relevant to the study of language standards such as vocabulary, grammar, and style are not considered.

History
RP has most in common with the dialects of South East Midlands, namely London, Oxford and Cambridge. By the end of the 15th century, "Standard English" was established in the City of London, though it did not begin to resemble RP until the late 19th century.

The introduction of the term Received Pronunciation is usually credited to the British phonetician Daniel Jones. In the first edition of the English Pronouncing Dictionary (1917), he named the accent "Public School Pronunciation"; for the second edition in 1926 he wrote: "In what follows I call it Received Pronunciation, for want of a better term." However, the term had been used much earlier by P. S. Du Ponceau in 1818 and the Oxford English Dictionary cites quotations back to about 1710. A similar term, received standard, was coined by Henry C. K. Wyld in 1927. The early phonetician Alexander John Ellis used both terms interchangeably, but with a much broader definition than Jones's, saying, "There is no such thing as a uniform educated pron. of English, and rp. and rs. is a variable quantity differing from individual to individual, although all its varieties are 'received', understood and mainly unnoticed".

According to Fowler's Modern English Usage (1965), "the correct term is 'the Received Pronunciation'. The word 'received' conveys its original meaning of 'accepted' or 'approved', as in 'received wisdom'."

Alternative names
 
Some linguists have used the term "RP" while expressing reservations about its suitability. The Cambridge-published English Pronouncing Dictionary (aimed at those learning English as a foreign language) uses the phrase "BBC Pronunciation", on the basis that the name "Received Pronunciation" is "archaic" and that BBC News presenters no longer suggest high social class and privilege to their listeners. Other writers have also used the name "BBC Pronunciation". The terms 'The Queen's English' or 'The King's English' have also been used by some writers, though the terms are more appropriately used to cover grammar as well as pronunciation.

The phonetician Jack Windsor Lewis frequently criticised the name "Received Pronunciation" in his blog: he has called it "invidious", a "ridiculously archaic, parochial and question-begging term" and noted that American scholars find the term "quite curious". He used the term "General British" (to parallel "General American") in his 1970s publication of A Concise Pronouncing Dictionary of American and British English and in subsequent publications. The name "General British" is adopted in the latest revision of Gimson's Pronunciation of English. Beverley Collins and Inger Mees use the term "Non-Regional Pronunciation" for what is often otherwise called RP, and reserve the term "Received Pronunciation" for the "upper-class speech of the twentieth century". Received Pronunciation has sometimes been called "Oxford English", as it used to be the accent of most members of the University of Oxford. The Handbook of the International Phonetic Association uses the name "Standard Southern British". Page 4 reads:

In her book Kipling's English History (1974) Marghanita Laski refers to this accent as "gentry". "What the Producer and I tried to do was to have each poem spoken in the dialect that was, so far as we could tell, ringing in Kipling's ears when he wrote it. Sometimes the dialect is most appropriately, Gentry. More often, it isn't."

Sub-varieties
Faced with the difficulty of defining a single standard of RP, some researchers have tried to distinguish between sub-varieties:

  proposed Conservative, General, and Advanced; "Conservative RP" referred to a traditional accent associated with older speakers with certain social backgrounds; General RP was considered neutral regarding age, occupation or lifestyle of the speaker; and Advanced RP referred to speech of a younger generation of speakers. Later editions (e.g., Gimson 2008) use the terms General, Refined and Regional RP. In the latest revision of Gimson's book, the terms preferred are General British (GB), Conspicuous GB and Regional GB.
  refers to "mainstream RP" and "U-RP"; he suggests that Gimson's categories of Conservative and Advanced RP referred to the U-RP of the old and young respectively. However, Wells stated, "It is difficult to separate stereotype from reality" with U-RP. Writing on his blog in February 2013, Wells wrote, "If only a very small percentage of English people speak RP, as Trudgill et al. claim, then the percentage speaking U-RP is vanishingly small" and "If I were redoing it today, I think I'd drop all mention of 'U-RP'".
 Upton distinguishes between RP (which he equates with Wells's "mainstream RP"), Traditional RP (after Ramsaran 1990), and an even older version which he identifies with Cruttenden's "Refined RP".
 An article on the website of the British Library refers to Conservative, Mainstream and Contemporary RP.

Characteristics and status
Traditionally, Received Pronunciation has been associated with high social class. It was the "everyday speech in the families of Southern English persons whose men-folk [had] been educated at the great public boarding-schools" and which conveyed no information about that speaker's region of origin before attending the school. An 1891 teacher's handbook stated, “It is the business of educated people to speak so that no-one may be able to tell in what county their childhood was passed”. Nevertheless, in the 19th century some British prime ministers, such as  William Ewart Gladstone, still spoke with some regional features.

Opinions differ over the proportion of Britons who speak RP. Trudgill estimated 3% in 1974, but that rough estimate has been questioned by J. Windsor Lewis. Upton notes higher estimates of 5% (Romaine, 2000) and 10% (Wells, 1982) but refers to these as "guesstimates" not based on robust research.

The claim that RP is non-regional is disputed, since it is most commonly found in London and the southeast of England. It is defined in the Concise Oxford English Dictionary as "the standard accent of English as spoken in the South of England", and alternative names such as “Standard Southern British” have been used.
Despite RP's historic high social prestige in Britain, being seen as the accent of those with power, money, and influence, it may be perceived negatively by some as being associated with undeserved, or accidental, privilege and as a symbol of the southeast's political power in Britain. Based on a 1997 survey, Jane Stuart-Smith wrote, "RP has little status in Glasgow, and is regarded with hostility in some quarters". A 2007 survey found that residents of Scotland and Northern Ireland tend to dislike RP. It is shunned by some with left-wing political views, who may be proud of having accents more typical of the working classes. 

Since the Second World War, and increasingly since the 1960s, a wider acceptance of regional English varieties has taken hold in education and public life. Nonetheless, surveys from 1969 to 2022 consistently show that RP is perceived as the most prestigious accent of English in the United Kingdom. In 2022, 25% of British adults reported being mocked for their regional accent at work, and 46% in social situations.

Use

Media
In the early days of British broadcasting speakers of English origin almost universally used RP. The first director-general of the BBC, Lord Reith, encouraged the use of a 'BBC accent' because it was a "style or quality of English which would not be laughed at in any part of the country". He distinguished the BBC accent from the 'Oxford accent', to which he was "vehemently opposed". In 1926 the BBC established an Advisory Committee on Spoken English with distinguished experts, including Daniel Jones, to advise on the correct pronunciation and other aspects of broadcast language. The Committee proved unsuccessful and was dissolved after the Second World War. 
While the BBC did advise its speakers on pronunciation, there was never a formalised official BBC pronunciation standard. A notable departure from the use of pure RP came with the Yorkshire-born newsreader Wilfred Pickles during the Second World War; his accent allowing listeners to more clearly distinguish BBC broadcasts from German propaganda, though Pickles had modified his accent to be closer to RP.
Since the Second World War RP has played a much smaller role in broadcast speech. RP remains the accent most often heard in the speech of announcers and newsreaders on BBC Radio 3 and Radio 4, and in some TV channels, but non-RP accents are now more widely encountered.

Dictionaries

Most English dictionaries published in Britain (including the Oxford English Dictionary) now give phonetically transcribed RP pronunciations for all words. Pronunciation dictionaries represent a special class of dictionary giving a wide range of possible pronunciations: British pronunciation dictionaries are all based on RP, though not necessarily using that name. Daniel Jones transcribed RP pronunciations of words and names in the English Pronouncing Dictionary. Cambridge University Press continues to publish this title, as of 1997 edited by Peter Roach. Two other pronunciation dictionaries are in common use: the Longman Pronunciation Dictionary, compiled by John C. Wells (using the name "Received Pronunciation"), and Clive Upton's Oxford Dictionary of Pronunciation for Current English, (now republished as The Routledge Dictionary of Pronunciation for Current English).

Language teaching
Pronunciation forms an essential component of language learning and teaching; a model accent is necessary for learners to aim at, and to act as a basis for description in textbooks and classroom materials. RP has been the traditional choice for teachers and learners of British English. However, the choice of pronunciation model is difficult, and the adoption of RP is in many ways problematic.

Phonology

Consonants

Nasals and liquids may be syllabic in unstressed syllables. The consonant  in RP is generally a postalveolar approximant, which would normally be expressed with the sign  in the International Phonetic Alphabet, but the sign  is nonetheless traditionally used for RP in most of the literature on the topic.

Voiceless plosives are aspirated at the beginning of a syllable, unless a completely unstressed vowel follows. Aspiration does not occur when  precedes in the same syllable, as in "spot" or "stop".

The glottal stop may be realised as creaky voice; thus, an alternative phonetic transcription of attempt  could be .

As in other varieties of English, voiced plosives are partly or even fully devoiced at utterance boundaries or adjacent to voiceless consonants. The voicing distinction between voiced and voiceless sounds is reinforced by a number of other differences, with the result that the two of consonants can clearly be distinguished even in the presence of devoicing of voiced sounds:

Aspiration of voiceless consonants syllable-initially.
Glottal reinforcement of /p, t, k, tʃ/ syllable-finally.
Shortening of vowels before voiceless consonants.

As a result, some authors prefer to use the terms "fortis" and "lenis" in place of "voiceless" and "voiced". However, the latter are traditional and in more frequent usage.

Vowels

Examples of short vowels:  in kit, mirror and rabbit,  in foot and cook,  in dress and merry,  in strut and curry,  in trap and marry,  in lot and orange,  in ago and sofa.

Examples of long vowels:  in fleece,  in goose,  in bear,  in nurse and furry,  in north, force and thought,  in father and start.

The long mid front vowel  is elsewhere transcribed with the traditional symbol . The predominant realisation in contemporary RP is monophthongal.

"Long" and "short" vowels
Many conventional descriptions of the RP vowel system group the non-diphthongal vowels into the categories "long" and "short". This should not be taken to mean that English has minimal pairs in which the only difference is vowel length. "Long" and "short" are convenient cover terms for a number of phonetic features. The long-short pairings shown above include also differences in vowel quality.

Vowels may be phonologically long or short (i.e. belong to the long or the short group of vowel phonemes) but their length is influenced by their context: in particular, they are shortened if a voiceless (fortis) consonant follows in the syllable, so that, for example, the vowel in 'bat'  is shorter than the vowel in 'bad' . The process is known as pre-fortis clipping. Thus phonologically short vowels in one context can be phonetically longer than phonologically long vowels in another context. For example, the vowel called "long"  in 'reach'  (which ends with a voiceless consonant) may be shorter than the vowel called "short"  in the word 'ridge'  (which ends with a voiced consonant).

In natural speech, the plosives  and  often have no audible release utterance-finally, and voiced consonants are partly or completely devoiced (as in ); thus the perceptual distinction between pairs of words such as 'bad' and 'bat', or 'seed' and 'seat' rests mostly on vowel length (though the presence or absence of glottal reinforcement provides an additional cue).

Unstressed vowels are both shorter and more centralised than stressed ones. In unstressed syllables occurring before vowels and in final position, contrasts between long and short high vowels are neutralised and short  and  occur (e.g. happy , throughout ).

Unstressed vowels vary in quality:
  (as in ) ranges from close front  to close-mid retracted front ;
  (as in ) ranges from close-mid central  to open-mid central .

Diphthongs and triphthongs

The centring diphthongs are gradually being eliminated in RP. See – merger. More recently  has become a pure long vowel , as explained above.  is increasingly pronounced as a monophthong , although without merging with any existing vowels.

This phenomenon has been discussed in several blogs by John C. Wells. In the recording included in this article the phrase "fold his cloak" contains examples of the  diphthong in the two different contexts. The onset of the pre- diphthong in "fold" is slightly more back and rounded than that in "cloak".

There are different possible realisations of these items: in slow, careful speech they may be pronounced as two syllables with three distinct vowel qualities in succession, or as a monosyllabic triphthong. In more casual speech the middle vowel may be considerably reduced, by a process known as smoothing, and in an extreme form of this process the triphthong may even be reduced to a single long vowel. This type of smoothing is known as the tower–tire, tower–tar and tire–tar mergers.

BATH vowel

There are differing opinions as to whether  in the BATH lexical set can be considered RP. The English Pronouncing Dictionary does not admit  in BATH words and the Longman Pronunciation Dictionary lists them with a § marker of non-RP status. John Wells wrote in a blog entry on 16 March 2012 that when growing up in the north of England he used  in "bath" and "glass", and considers this the only acceptable phoneme in RP. Others have argued that  is too categorical in the north of England to be excluded. Clive Upton believes that  in these words must be considered within RP and has called the opposing view "south-centric". Upton's Oxford Dictionary of Pronunciation for Current English gives both variants for BATH words. A. F. Gupta's survey of mostly middle-class students found that  was used by almost everyone who was from clearly north of the isogloss for BATH words. She wrote, "There is no justification for the claims by Wells and Mugglestone that this is a sociolinguistic variable in the north, though it is a sociolinguistic variable on the areas on the border [the isogloss between north and south]". In a study of speech in West Yorkshire, K. M. Petyt wrote that "the amount of  usage is too low to correlate meaningfully with the usual factors", having found only two speakers (both having attended boarding schools in the south) who consistently used .

Jack Windsor Lewis has noted that the Oxford Dictionary's position has changed several times on whether to include short  within its prescribed pronunciation. The BBC Pronouncing Dictionary of British Names uses only , but its author, Graham Pointon, has stated on his blog that he finds both variants to be acceptable in place names.

Some research has concluded that many people in the North of England have a dislike of the  vowel in BATH words. On the subject, K. M. Petyt wrote that several respondents "positively said that they did not prefer the long-vowel form or that they really detested it or even that it was incorrect". Mark Newbrook has assigned this phenomenon the name "conscious rejection", and has cited the  vowel as "the main instance of conscious rejection of RP" in his research in West Wirral.

French words
He also argues against including other French vowels on the grounds that not many British speakers succeed in distinguishing the vowels in bon and banc, or in rue and roue.

Alternative notation
Not all reference sources use the same system of transcription. Clive Upton devised a separate system for the Shorter Oxford English Dictionary (1993) and this is now used in many other Oxford University Press dictionaries.

The linguist Geoff Lindsey has argued that the system of transcription for RP has become outdated and has proposed a new system as a replacement, rather than RP.

Lindsey's system is as follows, differences between it and standard transcription are depicted with the usual transcription in brackets.

Historical variation

Like all accents, RP has changed with time. RP is sometimes known as the Queen's English, but recordings show that even Queen Elizabeth II changed her pronunciation over the course of her reign, ceasing to use an -like vowel in words like land. The change in RP may be observed in the home of "BBC English". The BBC accent of the 1950s is distinctly different from today's: a news report from the 1950s is recognisable as such, and a mock-1950s BBC voice is used for comic effect in programmes wishing to satirise 1950s social attitudes such as the Harry Enfield Show and its "Mr. Cholmondley-Warner" sketches.

A few illustrative examples of changes in RP during the 20th century and early 21st are given below. A more comprehensive list (using the name 'General British' in place of 'RP') is given in Gimson's Pronunciation of English.

Vowels and diphthongs

The Queen continued to use the older pronunciations, but it is now rare to hear this on the BBC.
 There used to be a distinction between horse and hoarse with an extra diphthong  appearing in words like hoarse, and pour. Daniel Jones gives an account of the /ɔə/ diphthong, but notes "many speakers of Received English (sic), myself among them, do not use the diphthong at all, but replace it always by /ɔː/".
The effect of these two mergers (horse-hoarse and moor-more) is to bring about a number of three-way mergers of items which were hitherto distinct, such as poor, paw and pore all becoming .
 The  vowel and the starting point of the FACE diphthong has become lowered from mid  to open-mid .
 Before the Second World War, the vowel of cup was a back vowel close to cardinal  but has since shifted forward to a central position so that  is more accurate; phonemic transcription of this vowel as /ʌ/ is still common largely for historical reasons.
 There has been a change in the pronunciation of the unstressed final vowel of 'happy' as a result of a process known as happY-tensing: an older pronunciation of 'happy' would have had the vowel /ɪ/ whereas a more modern pronunciation has a vowel nearer to /iː/. In pronunciation handbooks and dictionaries it is now common to use the symbol /i/ to cover both possibilities. 
 In a number of words where contemporary RP has an unstressed syllable with schwa , older pronunciations had , for instance, the final vowel in the following: kindness, witness, toilet, fortunate.
 The  phoneme (as in fair, care, there) was realized as a centring diphthong  in the past, whereas many present-day speakers of RP pronounce it as a long monophthong .
 A change in the symbolisation of the GOAT diphthong reflects a change in the pronunciation of the starting point: older accounts of this diphthong describe it as starting with [ö̞], moving towards [u]. This was often symbolized as /ou/ or /oʊ/. In modern RP the starting point is unrounded and central, and is symbolized /əʊ/.
 In a study of a group of speakers born between 1981 and 1993, it was observed that the vowel  had shifted upwards, approaching  in quality.
 As noted above,  has become more open, near to cardinal .

Consonants

 For speakers of Received Pronunciation in the late 19th century, it was common for the consonant combination  (as in which, whistle, whether) to be realised as a voiceless labio-velar fricative  (also transcribed ), as can still be heard in the 21st century in the speech of many speakers in Ireland, Scotland and parts of the US. Since the beginning of the 20th century, however, the  phoneme has ceased to be a feature of RP, except in an exaggeratedly precise style of speaking (the wine-whine merger).
 There has been considerable growth in glottalization in RP, most commonly in the form of glottal reinforcement. This has been noted by writers on RP since quite early in the 20th century. Ward notes pronunciations such as [njuːʔtrəl] for neutral and [reʔkləs] for reckless. Glottalization of /tʃ/ is widespread in present-day RP when at the end of a stressed syllable, as in butcher [bʊʔtʃə].
 The realization of /r/ as a tap or flap [ɾ] has largely disappeared from RP, though it can be heard in films and broadcasts from the first half of the 20th century. The word very was frequently pronounced [veɾɪ]. The same sound, however, is sometimes pronounced as an allophone of /t/ when it occurs intervocalically after a stressed syllable - the "flapped /t/" that is familiar in American English. Phonetically, this sounds more like /d/, and the pronunciation is sometimes known as /t/-voicing.

Word-specific changes

A number of cases can be identified where changes in the pronunciation of individual words, or small groups of words, have taken place.

 The word Mass (referring to the religious ritual) was often pronounced /mɑːs/ in older versions of RP, but the word is now almost always /mæs/.
 The indefinite article an was traditionally used before a sounded /h/ if immediately followed by an unstressed vowel, as in 'an hyaena.'  This is now uncommon, especially in speech, and may be confined only to some of the more frequently used words, such as 'horrific' and 'historical.'

Comparison with other varieties of English
 Like most other varieties of English outside Northern England, RP has undergone the foot–strut split (pairs nut/put differ).
 RP is a non-rhotic accent, so  does not occur unless followed immediately by a vowel (pairs such as caught/court and formally/formerly are homophones, save that formerly may be said with a hint of /r/ to help to differentiate it, particularly where stressed for reasons of emphasising past status e.g. "He was FORMERLY in charge here.").
 Unlike a number of North American accents of English, RP has not undergone the Mary–marry–merry, nearer–mirror, or hurry–furry mergers: all these words are distinct from each other.
 Unlike many North American accents, RP has not undergone the father–bother or cot–caught mergers.
This contrasts with many East Anglian and East Midland varieties of English language in England and with many forms of American English, including General American. For a subset of these, a yod has been lost over time: for example, in all of the words beginning suit, however the yod is sometimes deliberately reinserted in historical or stressed contexts such as "a suit in chancery" or "suitable for an aristocrat".
 RP has undergone wine–whine merger (so the sequence  is not present except among those who have acquired this distinction as the result of speech training). The Royal Academy of Dramatic Art, based in London, still teaches these two sounds for international breadth as distinct phonemes. They are also distinct from one another in most of Scotland and Ireland, in the northeast of England, and in the southeastern United States.
 Unlike some other varieties of English language in England, there is no h-dropping in words like head or horse. In hurried phrases such as "as hard as he could" h-dropping commonly applies to the word he.
 Unlike most Southern Hemisphere English accents, RP has not undergone the weak-vowel merger, meaning that pairs such as Lenin/Lennon are distinct.

Spoken specimen

The Journal of the International Phonetic Association regularly publishes "Illustrations of the IPA" which present an outline of the phonetics of a particular language or accent. It is usual to base the description on a recording of the traditional story of the North Wind and the Sun. There is an IPA illustration of British English (Received Pronunciation).

The female speaker is described as having been born in 1953, and educated at Oxford University. To accompany the recording there are three transcriptions: orthographic, phonemic and allophonic.

Phonemic

Allophonic

Orthographic

The North Wind and the Sun were disputing which was the stronger, when a traveller came along wrapped in a warm cloak. They agreed that the one who first succeeded in making the traveller take his cloak off should be considered stronger than the other. Then the North Wind blew as hard as he could, but the more he blew the more closely did the traveller fold his cloak around him, and at last the North Wind gave up the attempt. Then the Sun shone out warmly, and immediately the traveller took off his cloak. And so the North Wind was obliged to confess that the Sun was the stronger of the two.

Notable speakers

The following people have been described as RP speakers:

 The British Royal Family
 David Attenborough, broadcaster and naturalist
 David Cameron, former Prime Minister of the UK (2010–2016)
 Deborah Cavendish, Duchess of Devonshire, aristocrat and writer
 Judi Dench, actress
 Rupert Everett, actor
 Lady Antonia Fraser, author and historian
 Stephen Fry, actor and writer
 Christopher Hitchens, late author and journalist
 Boris Johnson, former Prime Minister of the UK (2019–2022)
 Vanessa Kirby, actress
 Joanna Lumley, actress
 Helen Mirren, actress
 Carey Mulligan, actress
 Jeremy Paxman, broadcaster and TV presenter
 Jacob Rees-Mogg, former leader of the House of Commons (2019–2022)
 Brian Sewell, art critic
 Ed Stourton, broadcaster and journalist
 Margaret Thatcher, former Prime Minister of the UK (1979–1990)
 Emma Watson, actress
 Justin Welby, Archbishop of Canterbury (2013–present)
 Rowan Williams, former archbishop of Canterbury (2002–2012)

See also 
 Accents (psychology)
 English language spelling reform
 Mid-Atlantic accent
 Linguistic prescription
 Prestige (sociolinguistics)
 U and non-U English

Notes and references

Bibliography

External links 
 BBC page on Upper RP as spoken by the English upper-classes
 Sounds Familiar?Listen to examples of received pronunciation on the British Library's 'Sounds Familiar' website
 'Hover & Hear' R.P., and compare it with other accents from the UK and around the World.
 Whatever happened to Received Pronunciation? – An article by the phonetician J. C. Wells about received pronunciation

Sources of regular comment on RP
 John Wells's phonetic blog
 Jack Windsor Lewis's PhonetiBlog
 Linguism – Language in a word, blog by Graham Pointon of the BBC Pronunciation Unit

Audio files
 Blagdon Hall, Northumberland
 Burnham Thorpe, Norfolk
 Harrow
 Hexham, Northumberland
 London
 Newport, Pembrokeshire
 Teddington

English language in England
Standard English
Standard languages